The 1977 Australasian Individual Speedway Championship was the second annual Australasian Final for Motorcycle speedway riders from Australia and New Zealand as part of the qualification for the 1977 Speedway World Championship.

The Final took place at the  Sydney Showground. Four time World Champion Ivan Mauger was the winner after defeating Phil Crump and defending Australasian Champion John Boulger in a runoff after all three riders finished on 14 points. Billy Sanders finished fourth to get the last qualifying spot in the 1977 Intercontinental Final to be held at the White City Stadium in London, England.

Ivan Mauger would go on to win his record equalling 5th World Championship later in the year at the Ullevi stadium in Göteborg, Sweden.

Australasian Final
 February 19
  Sydney, Australia - Sydney Showground
 Qualification: First 4 to the Intercontinental Final in London, England

References

See also
 Sport in Australia
 Motorcycle Speedway

Speedway competitions in New Zealand
1977 in speedway
Individual Speedway Championship
1977 in New Zealand motorsport